Keskal is a city in Kondagaon district formerly in Madhya Pradesh and now in Chhattisgarh, India.

Geography
It is located at an elevation of 651 m above MSL.

Location
Keskal is 129  km from Jagdalpur 180 km from Raipur, 30 km from Kanker and about 60 km north of Kondagaon on NH30.

The nearest airport is Raipur Airport and railway station is at Jagdalpur.

Tourism

Keshkal Ghat is a nearby attraction. It is a scenic spot and offers a view of the valley below. Keshkal PANCHAVATI is spot of tourism. GOBRAIEN is a pilgrim centre, where shiv linga temple is situated. Information regarding this can be obtained from situated in Keshkal Bus Stand.

Business and economy
The major business done by the peoples of Keshkal are sale and purchase of grains like rice, wheat, maize, mahua, and tamarind.
Keskal has heavy bauxite deposits.

References

Cities and towns in Kondagaon district